Central Stadium is a multi-purpose stadium in Taraz, Kazakhstan. It is currently used mostly for football matches and is the home stadium of FC Taraz.

References

Football venues in Kazakhstan
Multi-purpose stadiums in Kazakhstan